Aushim Khetarpal is an actor and producer from India.

Biography
He started his career as an Indian sports promoter; his name got involved in match fixing. He then made a feature film, Shirdi Saibaba as a producer and actor. The historical movie gained acknowledgements worldwide.

He then produced a film with Faisal Saif titled Come December, which was International Award Winner. The film is yet to be released worldwide. He is also seen in a TV serial Shirdi Saibaba, which airs on Sony TV India and on Zee TV.

Filmography

Actor
 Shirdi Saibaba (2001) ... Arjun
 Come December (2006) ... Om
 Om Allah (2011) ... Aushim

Producer
 Shirdi Saibaba (2001)
 Come December (2006)
 Om Allah (2011)

Awards
Won Best Spiritual Film of the Century 1st Diorama International Film Festival & Market (2019) for Shirdi Saibaba

Notes

External links
 

Male actors in Hindi cinema
Male actors in Hindi television
Living people
Indian male film actors
Year of birth missing (living people)